The Empire United Railways was an interurban railway that was owned by Clifford D. Beebe of Syracuse, New York. The Beebe Syndicate controlled interurbans that ran from Rochester to Syracuse, to Auburn to Oswego on Lake Ontario.

The company was consolidated into the Empire State Railway in 1917.

Gallery

Main gallery of images: :Commons:Railroad in Syracuse, New York

References

Defunct railroads in Syracuse, New York
Defunct New York (state) railroads
Railway companies established in 1912
Railway companies disestablished in 1917
Interurban railways in New York (state)
1912 establishments in New York (state)